The 2021–22 Nemzeti Bajnokság III is Hungary's third-level football competition.

Teams
The following teams have changed division since the 2020–21 season.

Stadium and locations
Following is the list of clubs competing in the league this season, with their location, stadium and stadium capacity.

Eastern Group

Centre Group

Western Group

Personnel and kits

Eastern Group

Standings

Eastern group

Central group

Western group

See also
 2021–22 Magyar Kupa
 2021–22 Nemzeti Bajnokság I
 2021–22 Nemzeti Bajnokság II
2021–22 Megyei Bajnokság I

References

External links
  
  

Nemzeti Bajnokság III seasons
2021–22 in Hungarian football
Hun